Phenylphenol may refer to:

 2-Phenylphenol
Sodium 2-phenylphenol
 4-Phenylphenol